Jean d'Aire is a sculpture by the French artist Auguste Rodin, first conceived around 1885 as part of the planning for his group The Burghers of Calais.

Versions

After the first group modello, he made individual studies of each figure. The first such study of d'Aire was nude, followed by one partially covered in a kind of toga and with the noose round his neck more obvious. He holds a cushion bearing the keys of Calais and is drawn to the left by the noose.  A bronze cast of this second version is now in the Museo Soumaya in Mexico City and other collections.

See also
List of sculptures by Auguste Rodin

References

External links

Sculptures by Auguste Rodin
Sculptures of the Museo Soumaya
1886 sculptures